Bessay is a commune in the Vendée department in the Pays de la Loire region in western France.

Geography
The river Smagne forms all of the commune's southern border, then flows into the Lay, which flows southwestward through the north-western part of the commune.

See also
Communes of the Vendée department

References

Communes of Vendée